The J.J. Hoag House, also known as The Wheat House, is a historic residence located in Manchester, Iowa, United States.  It received its nickname from its association to Hoag who was a grain dealer.  The house is a well-preserved example of the mid-19th century Italianate style.  The two-story frame structure features a hipped roof capped with a belvedere, bracketed eaves, and ornate window hoods.  The front porch and the porte-cochere were added around the turn of the 20th century.  The house was listed on the National Register of Historic Places in 1976.

References

Houses completed in 1864
Houses in Delaware County, Iowa
National Register of Historic Places in Delaware County, Iowa
Houses on the National Register of Historic Places in Iowa
Italianate architecture in Iowa